The Child Welfare League of America (CWLA) is a 501(c)(3) charitable organization that coordinates efforts for child welfare in the United States, and provides direct support to agencies that serve children and families. The organization's vision is "that every child will grow up in a safe, loving, and stable family," and its primary objective is to "Make Children a National Priority". The CWLA is run by professionals in the children's services field. As a national organization it lobbies for both child protection, and delivery of services to children.  It is the oldest child welfare organization in the United States.

History 
In 1909. U.S. President Theodore Roosevelt convened a While House Conference on the Care of Dependent Children. For the first time this brought together child welfare advocates from across the United States. In 1915, Carl Christian Carstens, the executive officer of the Massachusetts Society for the Prevention of Cruelty to Children, presented a report at the National Conference of Charities and Corrections (NCCC) meeting in Baltimore, detailing the need for cooperation among child welfare groups, the need for community planning, and the need for standards of child care. This resulted in the creation of the Bureau for the Exchange of Information among Child Helping Agencies (BEI) under the auspices and funding of the Russell Sage Foundation.  In 1917 the BEI became an independent non-profit association. Following a series of national conferences, the BEI undertook yo create a permanent national organization for all aspects of child welfare. With the financial assistance of the Commonwealth Fund the CWLA was organized in 1920 with Carl Carstens as its CEO, and formally began work on January 2, 1921 in New York City.   

While originally founded as a federation of sixty-five service-providing organizations, Carstens, among the most prominent of national child welfare leaders and an opponent of orphanages, wielded it into a force for the development of regulations, especially with regard to child-placement and adoption.

In 1985 the CWLA moved its headquarters from New York City to Washington, D.C. In 2008 the organization had Rep. Chaka Fattah introduce a bill in the U.S. Congress that would have created the White House Conference on Children and Youth for 2010; however, the bill did not pass.

The Indian Adoption Project 
From 1958 to 1967 the CCWLA ran the Indian Adoption Project together with the Bureau of Indian Affairs of the U.S. Department of Interior. Its mission was to place Native American children, primarily from poor households, with mainstream American families. It was criticized by Margaret Atwood and others as "the kidnapping of indigenous children", although most children were removed from their parents care through legal process, The Child Welfare League of America continued to assist in the adoption of Native American children even after 1967 when the program was ended. In 1978 Congressional Hearings found that “the wholesale separation of Indian children from their families is perhaps the most tragic and destructive aspect of American Indian life today.” This resulted in the Indian Child Welfare Act. In June 2001, Child Welfare League Executive Director Shay Bilchik formally apologized for the Indian Adoption Project saying “No matter how well intentioned and how squarely in the mainstream this was at the time, it was wrong; it was hurtful; and it reflected a kind of bias that surfaces feelings of shame.”

Selected publications
 Child Welfare (journal, 1948–present)

See also 
 Timeline of children's rights in the United States

Notes 

1921 establishments in New York City
Children's rights organizations in the United States
Organizations established in 1920
Non-profit organizations based in Washington, D.C.
501(c)(3) organizations